A botched execution is defined by political science professor Austin Sarat as:
Botched executions occur when there is a breakdown in, or departure from, the 'protocol' for a particular method of execution. The protocol can be established by the norms, expectations, and advertised virtues of each method or by the government’s officially adopted execution guidelines. Botched executions are 'those involving unanticipated problems or delays that caused, at least arguably, unnecessary agony for the prisoner or that reflect gross incompetence of the executioner.' Examples of such problems include, among other things, inmates catching fire while being electrocuted, being strangled during hangings (instead of having their necks broken), and being administered the wrong dosages of specific drugs for lethal injections.

List

Before 1900
 Thomas Cromwell (1540) – Beheading by axe. Edward Hall wrote that "So paciently suffered the stroke of the axe, by a ragged and Boocherly miser, which very ungoodly perfourmed the office."
 Margaret Pole, Countess of Salisbury (1541) – An inexperienced executioner reportedly hacked at her a total of 11 times before finally decapitating her. Some sources claim that Margaret refused to lay her head on the block, declaiming, "So should traitors do, and I am none"; according to the account, she turned her head "every which way", reportedly instructing the executioner that, if he wanted her head, he should take it as he could, although this may be apocryphal.
 Mary, Queen of Scots (1587) – Beheading by axe. The execution took three blows.
 William Russell, Lord Russell (1683) – Beheading by axe. The executioner, Jack Ketch, later wrote a letter of apology for conducting the execution poorly due to being distracted.
 James Scott, 1st Duke of Monmouth (1685) – Beheading by axe. Jack Ketch took between five and eight strokes to behead him.
 William Duell (1740) – Hanging. Survived the execution after being left hanging by the neck for around 20 minutes. Sentence commuted to transportation.
 Arthur Elphinstone, 6th Lord Balmerino (1746) – Beheading by axe. It is said that it took three blows to behead him.
 Robert-François Damiens (1757) – Dismemberment by horses. Limbs could not be torn off and had to be cut.
 Joseph Samuel (1805) – Hanging. Survived three attempts to hang him. Sentence commuted to life imprisonment.
 Charles Getter (1833) – Hanging. Survived the first attempt to hang him. Died in a second hanging a short time later.
 Henry Wirz (1865) – Hanging. The standard drop used failed to break his neck and he died slowly due to strangulation.
 Mary Ann Cotton (1873) – Hanging. The rope was rigged too short to break her neck and she instead died slowly from strangulation.
 Wallace Wilkerson (1879) – Firing squad. Died from bleeding 15 minutes after shots were fired but missed his heart.
 John "Babbacombe" Lee (1885) – Hanging. Survived three attempts after the trapdoor of the gallows failed to open; sentence subsequently commuted to life imprisonment.
 William Kemmler (1890) – Electric chair. The first man to be electrocuted using the electric chair, the execution took eight minutes as blood vessels under the skin ruptured and bled out.

20th century
 Tom "Black Jack" Ketchum (1901) – Hanging. The rope used was too long and he was decapitated. This was exacerbated by the fact that he had gained a considerable amount of weight while in custody prior to his execution.
 William Williams (1906) – Hanging. He hit the floor after dropping through the trap door of the gallows. Three men had to hold his body up by the rope for over 14 minutes until Williams finally died of strangulation.
 Wenceslao Moguel (1915) – Firing squad. He was shot nine times before a final coup de grâce was performed. He survived, although he was disfigured; he died in 1976.
 Eva Dugan (1930) – Hanging. She was decapitated by the rope.
 Gordon Northcott (1930) – Hanging. The rope was too slack to break his neck. It took 13 minutes for him to die from strangulation.
 Some of the Nuremberg executions (1946) – Hanging. It is likely that miscalculations may have led to the executioner using ropes that were too short for some executions, resulting in a failure to break the victim's neck and therefore a slower death from strangulation, although the United States Army denied this. Furthermore, the trapdoor of the gallows had been constructed so small that some condemned struck the sides of the trapdoor during the drop.
 Willie Francis (1946) – Electric chair. Gruesome Gertie, Louisiana's portable electric chair, was improperly set up before the execution by an intoxicated guard and inmate, resulting in the current not being strong enough to kill Francis or knock him unconscious. The execution failed as a result and Francis could be heard shouting "Take it off! Take it off! Let me breathe!" by witnesses. He was successfully executed a year later.
 Arthur Lucas (1962) – Hanging. He was almost completely decapitated due to the executioner miscalculating his weight.
 Ginggaew Lorsoungnern (1979) – Firing squad. She survived an initial round of ten shots. Because of Ginggaew's situs inversus, none of the bullets had struck her right-sided heart. After being brought to the morgue, it was discovered that she was still alive. She died after a second round of gunfire.
 Frank J. Coppola (1982) – Electric chair. It took two 55-second jolts of electricity to kill him.
 Jimmy Lee Gray (1983) – Gas chamber. Repeatedly banged his head into an iron bar while being gassed.
 John Louis Evans (1983) – Electric chair. Took three charges and lasted 24 minutes, leaving his body charred and smoldering.
 Alpha Otis Stephens (1984) – Electric chair. The first charge of two-minute, 2,080-volt electricity administered failed to kill him, and he struggled to breathe for eight minutes before a second charge carried out his death sentence.
 Stephen McCoy (1989) – Lethal injection. Had a violent reaction to the drugs which caused his chest to heave. In addition, he gasped, choked, and arched his back off the gurney. A witness fainted during the execution.
 Jesse Tafero (1990) – Electric chair. The machine malfunctioned, causing six-inch flames to shoot out of Tafero's head. Three jolts of electricity were required to execute Tafero, in a process that took seven minutes.
 Donald Eugene Harding (1992) – Gas chamber. His asphyxiation took 11 minutes before death was finally confirmed.
 Pedro Medina (1997) – Electric chair. During his execution, Medina's head burst into flames and filled the chamber with smoke.
 Allen Lee Davis (1999) – Electric chair. Bled profusely from the nose while being electrocuted, and he suffered burns to his head, leg, and groin area.

21st century
 Joseph Lewis Clark (2006) – Lethal injection. The execution took nearly 90 minutes.
 Ángel Nieves Díaz (2006) – Lethal injection. He needed an additional dose of drugs to be executed. The full process took approximately 34 minutes as opposed to the usual 7.5 minutes. A post-mortem examination revealed that Díaz's IVs were improperly inserted past his veins to his subcutaneous soft tissue.
 Barzan Ibrahim al-Tikriti (2007) – Hanging. He was decapitated as a result of an error in the calculations resulting in him being dropped too far.
 Romell Broom (2009) – Lethal injection. Cried in pain after being stabbed by needles 18 times. The execution was called off after two hours. A second execution was later scheduled for 2022, but he died in prison in 2020 before it could be carried out.
 Dennis McGuire (2014) – Lethal injection. Executed using a new, untried and untested lethal drug combination and took over 25 minutes to die.
 Clayton Lockett (2014) – Lethal injection. Was observed convulsing and attempting to speak for 43 minutes after the drugs were administered. Ultimately died of a heart attack.
 Joseph Wood (2014) – Lethal injection. Instead of the usual ten minutes with one dose being sufficient to kill him, he underwent a two-hour injection procedure in which he was injected with the drug cocktail 15 times.
 Alva Campbell (2017) – Lethal injection. Executioners were unable to find a suitable vein. A second attempt was scheduled for 2019, but he died in prison from natural causes in 2018.
 Doyle Lee Hamm (2018) – Lethal injection. Was stabbed with needles for more than two and a half hours as the execution team tried to locate a suitable vein. The execution failed. The State of Alabama later agreed not to attempt to execute him again as part of a confidential settlement, thus de facto reducing his sentence to life imprisonment without parole. He died of cancer (which had contributed to the botched execution) in prison in 2021.
 John Marion Grant (2021) – Lethal injection. Most witnesses observed Grant convulsing, straining against his restraints, struggling to breathe, and vomiting. He took 21 minutes to die. His autopsy showed that the execution drugs caused him to suffer a flash pulmonary edema.
 Joe Nathan James Jr. (2022) – Lethal injection. He took three hours to die.

References

External links
 America's Long and Gruesome History of Botched Executions, 5 December 2014, Wired.com

Lists of executed people
Error